Gay House may refer to:

Gay House (Montgomery, Alabama)
Ebenezer Gay House, Sharon, Connecticut
Mary Gay House, Decatur, Georgia
Charles Gay House, Waimea, Hawaii
Wilbur D. and Hattie Cannon House, Iowa City, Iowa, also known as the Cannon-Gay House
Andrew H. Gay House, Plaquemine, Louisiana, listed on the National Register of Historic Places (NRHP)
Rev. Samuel Gay House, Hubbardston, Massachusetts
Tolman-Gay House, Needham, Massachusetts
Jared H. Gay House, Crystal Valley, Michigan
C. E. Gay House, Starkville, Mississippi, listed on the NRHP
Edward Gay House, Kalispell, Montana, listed on the NRHP
Alpheus Gay House, Manchester, New Hampshire
Thomas Haskins Gay House, Belle Fourche, South Dakota, listed on the NRHP
Daniel Gay House, Stockbridge, Vermont